Jessie Gregory (born August 24, 1984) is a Canadian ice sledge hockey. A member of the Canada women's national ice sledge hockey team since 2011, she competed in the first-ever IPC Ice Sledge Hockey Women's International Cup in 2014.

Playing career
Having sustained a spinal cord injury after being hit by a car in 2008, Gregory also endured permanent nerve damage to her legs. Gregory began playing ice sledge hockey in 2011. When she is not competing with the national team, Gregory's club team is the Brant County Crushers, which compete in the Ontario Sledge Hockey Association. Having also played with Gregory on the national team, Tuyet Morris Yurczyszyn is one of her teammates on the Crushers.

Canada Women's National Sled Hockey Team
Gregory made her debut for the national team in 2012, at a Women's Sledge Hockey Tournament which was held in Voorhees, New Jersey. Competing at the IPC Ice Sledge Hockey Women's International Cup from November 7–9, 2014 in Brampton, Ontario, Canada, Gregory was one of two goaltenders on the Canadian roster, sharing duties with Shawnie Snell.

Personal
Gregory served as one of the Brantford, Ontario community torch bearers on June 19, 2015 during the torch relay for the 2015 Pan American Games.

References

External links
Official website

1984 births
Living people
Canadian sledge hockey players
Sportspeople from Brantford